Nivan or Niwan in Iran may refer to:
 Nivan-e Nar
 Nivan-e Suq
 Nivan Rural District